Live from Tokyo is a live EP by Japanese band Superfly, performed at the Shibuya Apple Store on June 6, 2007, and then released exclusively to the iTunes Store on June 27. It was one of the earliest Live from Tokyo albums released to the iTunes Store in Japan. It consists of covers of four rock songs from the late 1960s and early 1970s. The tracks (except for "Heart of Gold") were subsequently released as B-sides to the group's single "Hi-Five". All four songs are included on the second disc of the "Wildflower & Cover Songs: Complete Best 'Track 3'" single.

Track list

References

2007 live albums
Superfly (band) albums
Live albums by Japanese artists
iTunes Live from Tokyo (Superfly EP)
2007 EPs
Live EPs
Japanese-language EPs
Warner Music Japan EPs